Hanaborg Station is a railway station on the Trunk Line in Lørenskog, Norway. It is served by the Oslo Commuter Rail line L1 operated by Vy running from Lillestrøm via Oslo S to Spikkestad. The station was opened in 1956, the same year the line was electrified.

External links
Jernbaneverket's entry on Hanaborg station

Railway stations in Lørenskog
Railway stations on the Trunk Line
Railway stations opened in 1956
1956 establishments in Norway